The Manufacturers Railway Company  is a defunct railway company in St. Louis, Missouri. It was owned by Anheuser-Busch.

History
The railway company was founded in 1887 by Adolphus Busch, the President of Anheuser-Busch. By 1906, Busch was still President while William D. Orthwein was Vice President.

The company's line connected with the Terminal Railroad Association of St. Louis and the Alton and Southern Railroad in East St. Louis, Illinois. The MRS accessed the Alton and Southern Railroad using trackage rights over the Terminal Railroad Association of St. Louis via the MacArthur Bridge. MRS owned railroad cars used to transport Anheuser-Busch's products. It also provided locomotive maintenance and painting services to other companies.

On March 25, 2011, it was announced that Anheuser-Busch had applied to shut down the MRS, after the brewery began shipping outbound products via truck instead of rail. However, on April 8, Foster Townsend Rail Logistics (reporting marks: FTRL) announced that it planned to take over operations of the line once Manufacturers Railway ceased operations. On October 2, 2011, FTRL Railway began providing rail switching services at Anheuser Busch's St. Louis brewery.

See also

Anheuser-Busch

References

Further reading
Jane's World Railways - Manufacturers Railway Company (MRS) (United States)

External links
Manufacturers Railway Company's official website
Union Pacific Railroad - Manufacturers Railway Company MRS #460

Defunct Illinois railroads
Defunct Missouri railroads
Railway companies established in 1887
Switching and terminal railroads
Anheuser-Busch